Airport station is a light rail station located at the Salt Lake City International Airport in Salt Lake City, Utah, serviced by the Green Line of the Utah Transit Authority's (UTA) TRAX system. The Green Line has service to West Valley City via Downtown Salt Lake City, and connects with the rest of the TRAX system, as well as UTA's FrontRunner commuter rail and S Line streetcar.

Coinciding with the rebuilding of the airport's main terminal building, the station was moved a few hundred feet to the northwest, directly adjacent to the new terminal. Construction started in March 2020 and finished on October 25, 2021.

Description
The station is located at 700 North Terminal Drive (immediately south of the east end of Terminal 1), with the island platform extending south from the terminal. Unlike many TRAX stations, Airport does not have a Park and Ride lot. As part of the construction of this station a yet-unstaffed Welcome Center was built just inside the entrance from the station to Terminal One, which includes a direct phone line to UTA's customer services and ticket kiosks. Like many other UTA stations, this station has artwork included in its design. The work of art for the Airport station is the fence separating the station from the roadway approaching the terminals. The yellow fence was built to have the appearance of a mountain skyline. It is called The Canyon and was designed by Gordon Huether of Napa, California. It takes about 20 minutes to travel from the Airport station to the downtown area. The station is part of a railway right-of-way that was created specifically for the Green Line. The station opened on April 14, 2013, and is operated by the Utah Transit Authority.

Notes

References

TRAX (light rail) stations
Railway stations in the United States opened in 2013
Railway stations in Salt Lake City
2013 establishments in Utah
Airport railway stations in the United States
UTA Station